Hans Ernback (27 March 1942 – 19 February 2013) was a Swedish actor. He appeared in 20 films and television shows between 1966 and 1984.

Filmography

References

External links

1942 births
2013 deaths
20th-century Swedish male actors
Swedish male film actors
Swedish male television actors
People from Luleå